Reid's Arkansas Battery (1862), was a Confederate artillery battery that served during the American Civil War. Another Arkansas battery, the 1st Arkansas Light Artillery, a.k.a. the Fort Smith Artillery, was also once known as "Reid's Battery". Captain Reid had commanded the Fort Smith Artillery during the Battle of Wilson's Creek, but left that organization and later organized a second battery that is the subject of this article.

The first "Reid's Battery" 
Captain John G. Reid had previous served as the commander of a volunteer militia company of the 51st Militia Regiment, Sebastian County, Arkansas, The Fort Smith Artillery. The battery was originally identified simply as the "Independent Artillery" but was later styled the "Fort Smith Battery" or the "Fort Smith Artillery". Following the Battle of Wilson's Creek, the Fort Smith Artillery reorganized for Confederate service and Captain Reid did not stand for re-election, having accepted a staff position. The Fort Smith Artillery elected David Provence as captain on September 17, 1861 and was transferred east of the Mississippi River following the Confederate defeat at the Battle of Pea Ridge.

Rebuilding Arkansas Confederate Artillery
After the battle of Pea Ridge, General Earl Van Dorn was ordered to move his Army of the West across the Mississippi River and cooperate with Confederate forces in Northern Mississippi. Van Dorn stripped the state of military hardware of all types, including almost all the serviceable artillery. When General Thomas C. Hindman arrived to assume command of the new Trans-Mississippi District, he found almost nothing to command. He quickly began organizing new regiments, but his most pressing need was for arms for the new forces he was organizing, including the artillery. With Hindman's first order, dated May 31, 1862 at Little Rock, he announced his staff, including the appointment of Major Francis A. Shoup, Chief of Artillery. Hindman ordered guns, which the United States Arsenal had decommissioned and buried as property markers around the Arsenal in Little Rock, to be dug up and refurbished as best possible as serviceable weapons. Hindman was almost totally destitute of military quality weapons and could hardly arm or issue ammunition to the few troops that he had in June 1862. In July 1862, General Hindman wrote describing his efforts at organization and his need for arms for his men.

General Hindman ordered two enterprising young staff officers, Captain R.A. Hart and Major J.B. Lockman to travel to Grenada, Jackson, Columbus, Mississippi and other depots, with requisitions for ordnance and ordnance stores, instructing them to take even condemned articles, and to bring them to Arkansas by the most practicable route.  Arms and cannon secured by these two were moved to Gaines Landing on the Mississippi River, where they were loaded onto flatboats and moved across the river between Union gunboat patrols.  Apparently this activity did not go unnoticed by Union forces operating along the river:.

By August 5, 1862, General Hindman wrote to General Cooper describing the improvement in his supply situation

At the same time, General Mosely M. Parson's Brigade returned to Arkansas from Van Dorn's Army in Mississippi in August 1862.  General Parson brought with him a wagon train of quartermaster supplies and five pieces of artillery.  The quantity of guns supplied led to the organization and reorganization of several Artillery batteries in August and September 1862 in Arkansas.

Organization
The organization of Reid's Arkansas Battery apparently occurred in the summer of 1862 as Hindman attempted to build Confederate forces in Arkansas. On July 17, 1862, General Hindman issued Special Order #29 which directed Captain Reed  to report to Col Carroll who was commanding Northwest Arkansas.  Reid was to take four iron guns to be turned over to a Capt Pratt. Capt Shelby or the commanding officer of Shelby's infantry company was to proceed with his company with Capt Reed to Fort Smith. ... Capt Pratt was ordered to turn over to Reed the four iron pieces and will receive from Capt Daniels and Capt Woodruff two guns each. On July 27, 1862, Colonel Carrol reported the arrival of Captain Ried's battery at Fort Smith, Arkansas.

On July 27, 1862, Colonel Robert C. Newton, who was General Hindman's Adjutant, wrote to Brigadier General James S. Rains who Hindman had assigned to command Confederate forces in northwest Arkansas,

On August 8, 1862 Colonel Newton telegraphed Colonel Carroll, General Cooper and Brigadier Rains to explain Hindman' arrangement of artillery.  General Rains was to get Reid's battery, but was directed to return to Colonel Carroll men Carroll had detailed from his command for Reid's battery.  General Rains was directed to provide manpower for Reid's battery by detailing men from his own forces.

Major General Hindman relieved Rains of command in October 1862 for "incompetence and insobriety.

On August 17, 1862, General Hindman sent an order to Brigadier General Rains which directed that guns of Captain Reid's company being turned over to Captain Roberts' company. On the same day General Rains reported:

Exactly what made Captain Reid objectionable to General Rains is unclear.  It may simply have been that General Rains desired that Captain Roberts, a Missourian, command the battery organized from Missouri soldiers to support Rains largely Missouri brigade. Subsequently General Rains was relieved of command by General Hindman in October 1862 for "incompetence and insobriety."  Captain Roberts would go on to command a four-gun batter assigned to Colonel Robert G. Shaver's Brigade of Brigadier General Daniel M. Frost's Division during the Battle of Prairie Grove.  Roberts' Battery would eventually be designated as the 1st Battery, Missouri Light Artillery.

The state of the artillery belonging to Rains command was included in a letter dated Sept 22 1862, from the Headquarters, District of Arkansas, which described it thus:

General Raines was relieved by General Hindman in October 1862 for "incompetence and insobriety."

Service
By the time of the Battle of Prairie Grove on December 7, 1862, Captain Reid was commanding a 37-man battery armed with two 6-pounder smooth-bore cannon assigned to Brigadier General John S. Roane's Division of General Hindman's First Corps, Army of the Trans-Mississippi.

Brigadier General Roane's Division was assigned on the Confederate left flank during the battle.  While not hotly engaged,

General Roane's force screened the left flank of Brigadier General Mosby M. Parsons brigade from Union cavalry. Reid's Battery helped drive off an attack by the 9th Kansas Cavalry regiment which had threatened the Confederate flank. One section of Captain Reid's battery was apparently detached to support General Parsons brigade.  Parsons placed this section on his left, protected by the brigade's sharpshooters and Ponders' Infantry Regiment.

Disbanded
Following the confederate defeat at Prairie Grove, Hindman's forces retreated back across the Boston Mountains to Van Buren, Arkansas. In the reorganization of the Confederate Army following its retreat from northwest Arkansas, Reid's Battery was disbanded. On December 24, 1862, General Hindman directed Captain Reid to report to Colonel David Providence, Chief of Artillery at Fort Smith, Arkansas with his battery. Reid was to turn in the guns, equipments, and horses, which were to be turned over to General Frost's and General Fagan's Division. Any items not needed by these commands were to be turned over to the Chief of Ordnance or Post Quarter Master.  The officers were to be relieved, while the men were to return to the camp of General Roane to be incorporated with his Texas Infantry, either as a company or returned to their original companies.  These orders were to be accomplished no later than December 25, 1862.  No reason for the dispersion of the unit was stated.  Captain John G. Reid virtually disappears following the break-up of his unit.

See also 

 List of Arkansas Civil War Confederate units
 Lists of American Civil War Regiments by State
 Confederate Units by State
 Arkansas in the American Civil War
 Arkansas Militia in the Civil War

Notes

References 
 Allardice, B. S. (1995). More generals in gray. Baton Rouge: Louisiana State University Press.
 Oldham, K., Clayton, P., Conway, E. N., Flanagin, H., Murphy, I., Rector, H. M., & Arkansas. (1860). Kie Oldham papers.
 Shea, W. L. (2009). Fields of blood: The Prairie Grove Campaign. Chapel Hill: University of North Carolina Press.
 United States. (1961). Compiled service records of Confederate soldiers who served in organizations from the State of Arkansas. Washington D.C.: National Archives, National Archives and Records Service, General Services Administration.
 U.S. War Department, The War of the Rebellion: a Compilation of the Official Records of the Union and Confederate Armies, U.S. Government Printing Office, 1880–1901.
Weant, K. (2009). Civil War records: Missouri State Guard & Confederate artillery batteries plus William Quantrill's Company & miscellaneous records (3454 names). Arlington, Tex.?: K.E. Weant.

External links
Edward G. Gerdes Civil War Home Page
The Encyclopedia of Arkansas History and Culture
The War of the Rebellion: a Compilation of the Official Records of the Union and Confederate Armies
The Arkansas History Commission, State Archives, Civil War in Arkansas

Units and formations of the Confederate States Army from Arkansas
1862 disestablishments in Arkansas
Military units and formations disestablished in 1862
Military units and formations in Arkansas
Military in Arkansas
1862 establishments in Arkansas
Military units and formations established in 1862
Artillery units and formations of the American Civil War